On 13 March 2021, a Class 507 electric multiple unit operated by Merseyrail collided with the buffer stop at Kirkby railway station, Merseyside, United Kingdom. The only injury was the driver of the train. The cause was found to be that the driver was using a mobile phone whilst driving. The distraction led him to enter the station at excessive speed. He was fired and prosecuted, pleading guilty to a charge of endangering the safety of people on the railway.

Background

The layout at Kirkby station is unusual. In 1977, for operational reasons, the line was split at Kirkby, with the two ends facing each other on a single extended platform. Buffer stops are provided on the end of each line, with a concrete section between the two.

Accident

At 18:52 on 13 March 2021, a Class 507 electric multiple unit collided with the buffers. The train went through the buffer stop and collided with a bridge. The train formed the 18:35 service from  station to Kirkby. There were two crew and twelve passengers on board. The emergency services were alerted at 19:01 and arrived at 19:05. Merseyside Fire and Rescue Service, the North West Ambulance Service and Merseyside Police all attended the scene. The train was formed of two Class 507 units, 507 006 and 507 021. All fourteen people on board the train were treated at the scene by paramedics. The driver was taken to hospital with minor injuries.

Merseyside Fire and Rescue Service had handed over control of the scene to the British Transport Police (BTP) by 21:40. As a result of the accident, unit 507 006 was withdrawn from service. It was scrapped in September 2021. Damage to the station cost £450,000 to repair. The station reopened on 21 March.

Investigations
The Rail Accident Investigation Branch opened an investigation into the accident. The RAIB published its final report on 11 August 2022.

The Office of Rail and Road and BTP also opened investigations into the accident. The BTP investigation found that the driver had been using WhatsApp on his mobile phone 26 seconds before the accident. It was later disclosed that he had been messaging about the death that day of Murray Walker.
The train was still doing  when it collided with the buffer stop.

Prosecution
On 31 March, it was reported that the driver had been arrested by British Transport Police on suspicion of endangering the safety of the railway. He was released on bail, then charged on 20 January 2022. Merseyrail dismissed the driver in September 2021. At his trial on 8 February 2022, the driver pleaded guilty to endangering the safety of passengers on the railway.
On 8 March 2022, the driver was sentenced to 12 months in prison suspended for two years, 180hours of community service and a three month evening curfew.

References

2020s in Merseyside
Railway accidents in 2021
March 2021 events in the United Kingdom
Train collisions in England
Derailments in England
Railway accidents and incidents in Merseyside
2021 in England
Metropolitan Borough of Knowsley